Tuckiar v The King is a landmark Australian judgment of the High Court which was decided on 8 November 1934, after a two-day hearing on 29–30 October 1934.  The matter examined the behaviour of the judge and lawyers in the trial of Yolngu man Dhakiyarr (Tuckiar) Wirrpanda in the Northern Territory Supreme Court a year earlier for one of the Caledon Bay murders, and overturned the judgement  which had found the appellant guilty and sentenced him to death.

At the time the original case had stirred much controversy and caused a debate about the appropriateness of the Australian justice system for Indigenous Australians. It has become a case study in, and raises many issues for, legal ethics regarding instructions by Judges and the behaviour of defence counsel, as well as the treatment of Indigenous people before the Australian justice system.

Background
Dhakiyarr Wirrpanda, a Yolngu Aboriginal man living a traditional life, was sentenced to death in the Northern Territory Supreme Court for the murder by spearing of a police constable,  Albert McColl, on Woodah Island, an island off Arnhem Land on the northern coast of Australia. McColl had gone to Arnhem Land with a police party to apprehend some Aboriginal people thought to have killed the crew of a Japanese pearling lugger. It emerged that McColl had been handcuffed to Djappari, a wife of Dhakiyarr, and some other women.

The trial lasted only one day, with a guilty verdict returned by the 12-person jury after what was later deemed to be misdirection by Judge Wells. Defence arguments of self-defence or provocation were not put to the jury. The episode surrounding these killings and that of another two men were referred to in the press as the Caledon Bay murders.

Appeal
The case which became known as Tuckiar v. the King was the appeal in the High Court of Australia from the Supreme Court of the Northern Territory. The case was heard over two days, 29–30 October 1934, in Melbourne after some protest and lobbying by people including the Anglican clergyman A. P. Elkin.

The High Court unanimously found that there had been a miscarriage of justice, and that the trial judgment should be set aside.

On the way home from his seven-month incarceration in Fannie Bay Gaol, Dhakiyarr went missing, never to be seen again.

Legacy

In an act of reconciliation, 38 descendants of McColl and around 200 descendants of Dhakiyarr attended a 2003 ceremony in the Supreme Court of the Northern Territory in Darwin. This was chronicled in the 2004 film Dhakiyarr vs the King, by Tom Murray and Allan Collins, which went on to win the NSW Premier's History Award, was nominated for the Grand Jury Prize in the 2005 Sundance Film Festival and won the Rouben Mamoulian Award in the Sydney Film Festival.

The quote "Our system of administering justice necessarily imposes upon those who practise advocacy duties which have no analogies, and the system cannot dispense with their strict observance." from the case was used in the AB v CD; EF v CD court case concerning the use of the criminal barrister Nicola Gobbo as a secret informant by the Victorian Police.

References

Further reading

News reports of the day

 – "...the full text of the Judgment of the High Court in the McColl case, and is the joint judgment of the Chief Justice (Sir Gavan Duffy), and Justices Dixon, Evatt, and McTierman. The separate judgment of Mr. Justice Starke, who concurred with his brother judges in acquitting Tuckiar, will appear in our next issue."
 - detailed transcription of court proceedings, including words of the judge when handing down judgement.

Other

 - cites the case as an example of "responsible lawyering" justification.

High Court of Australia cases
1934 in case law
Yolngu
1934 in Australian law
Australian criminal law